Mather Field/Mills is a side platformed Sacramento RT light rail station in Rancho Cordova, California, United States. The station was opened on September 6, 1998, and is operated by the Sacramento Regional Transit District. It is served by the Gold Line. The station is located near the intersection of Mather Field Road and Folsom Boulevard, is served by various RT bus routes and serves the nearby Mather Field.

When the station opened in 1998, it replaced Butterfield as the eastern terminus of what was then the original RT light rail alignment (Watt/I-80–Downtown–Butterfield line) and was the first extension to the original network. It would remain the terminus through June 11, 2004, when the line was extended to Sunrise and eventually all the way to Folsom.

Platforms and tracks

Deaths

A teenage girl, 15-year-old Mariah Burgess, was struck and killed on November 13, 2014, just north of the tracks.  She was hit using the crossway located at the intersection of Folsom Boulevard and Coloma Road, just east of the station.

A bicyclist was killed at the Mather Field/Mills station on November 18, 2014.

References

Sacramento Regional Transit light rail stations
Rancho Cordova, California
Railway stations in the United States opened in 1998